Toxoides is a genus of moths belonging to the subfamily Thyatirinae of the Drepanidae.

Species
 Toxoides sichuanensis Zhuang, Owada & Wang, 2014
 Toxoides undulatus (Moore, 1867)

References

 , 1893, The Fauna of British India, Moths 1: 185.
 , 2007, Esperiana Buchreihe zur Entomologie Band 13: 1-683 
 ;  & , 2014: A new species of the genus Toxoides Hampson, 1893 (Lepidoptera: Thyatiridae) from China

Thyatirinae
Drepanidae genera